Christians on the Left, formerly known as the Christian Socialist Movement (CSM), is a socialist society in the UK. The movement fulfils a need among Christian socialists for an organisation that would be both politically engaged and theologically reflective. Christians on the Left is a member organisation of the International League of Religious Socialists. Members have included Labour leaders John Smith, Tony Blair, and Gordon Brown, R. H. Tawney, and Donald Soper. Today, Christians on the Left has over 40 members in the House of Commons and the House of Lords. 

As of October 2022, its director is Hannah Rich and its executive committee chair is Jonathan Reynolds.

History 
The Christian Socialist Movement was founded in 1960 when the Society of Socialist Clergy and Ministers and the Socialist Christian League merged. R. H. Tawney made one of his last public appearances at the movement's inaugural meeting on 22 January 1960. Donald Soper chaired the movement until becoming its President in 1975. In 1998, it affiliated to the Labour Party. It was a volunteer organisation until 1994 when it appointed a co-ordinator, followed by an administrator. In August 2013, it announced that, following a consultation with its members, it would be changing its name to Christians on the Left.

Gallery

References

External links
 

Christian socialist organizations
Labour Party (UK) socialist societies
Organisations based in the London Borough of Wandsworth
Religion in the London Borough of Wandsworth